Huberantha rumphii is a species of plant in the family Annonaceae. It is native to Brunei, Indonesia, Malaysia, The Philippines, and The Solomon Islands. August Wilhelm Henschel the German physician and botanist who first formally described the species, using the basionym Guatteria rumphii, named it after the German botanist Georg Eberhard Rumphius who cataloged many plant species in Indonesia.

Description
It is a tree reaching 15 meters in height. Its young branches are covered in fine rust colored hairs but become hairless when mature. Its hairless, slightly leathery, oblong to lance-shaped leaves are 10-22 by 3.5-7.5 centimeters with pointed tips and bases. The leaves have 9-12 pairs of secondary veins emanating from their midribs. Its flowers occur on solitary, 1-2 centimeter-long pedicels in axillary positions. The pedicels have several small, rounded, basal bracts and a larger, 5 millimeter-long bract midway along its length. The medial bract is covered in rust-colored hairs and has edges that curve backwards. Its triangular sepals are 0.6-1.5 centimeters long.  The sepals have pointed tips and are covered in rust colored fine hairs. Its flowers have 6 petals arranged in two rows of three. Its variably shaped petals are 3-5.5 centimeters long with edges that are often wavy.

Reproductive biology
The pollen of H. rumphii is shed as permanent tetrads.

References

Annonaceae
Flora of Malesia
Flora of the Solomon Islands (archipelago)
Plants described in 1833
Taxa named by August Wilhelm Henschel
rumphii